Telephata is a genus of moth in the family Lecithoceridae.

Species
 Telephata cheramopis Meyrick, 1916
 Telephata ferruginula Park, 2011
 Telephata melanista Park, 2011
 Telephata nitens (Diakonoff, 1954)

References

 
Lecithocerinae
Moth genera